The National Football League (NFL)'s New York Jets began play in 1960 as the Titans of New York, a charter member of the American Football League (AFL). When the Titans became the Jets in 1963 the team colors changed from navy blue and gold to green and white, which they have remained ever since, although the franchise has used different shades of green and has at times used black as a third/trim color. For most of their history, the Jets had white helmets with green striping and logos, green and white jerseys with opposite-colored sleeves and shoulder stripes, and white pants with two green stripes down each side. The team switched to green helmets and a simpler design in 1978, replacing the football-shaped logo with a modernized wordmark, then in 1990 added black trim and green pants. In 1998 the team reverted to its "classic" look, with an updated version of the prior logo, and replaced the traditional kelly green with a darker hunter green.

The Jets' current uniforms have been in use since 2019; the colors are now a medium green that the franchise calls "Gotham Green,” white, and black. The primary logo is a green football-shaped oval outlined in white, oriented horizontally, with the word "JETS" in thick, sans-serif italics positioned just below the horizontal axis with "NEW YORK" above it in smaller letters, and a miniature football graphic at bottom center partially covering the lower portion of the "E" and "T".

The primary uniform consists of green jerseys with white numerals and white jerseys with green numerals, green and white pants, and green socks. The numerals are in a new sans-serif block-style font and have thin black outlines, with "NEW YORK" in thick sans-serif italics above the numerals on the front, TV numerals on the upper shoulders, and the player's name in sans-serif block letters on the back, in either green or white. The jerseys have opposite-colored horizontal stripes around the shoulders that taper toward the collar, and the pants have an opposite-colored stripe on each side that tapers toward the mid-thigh.

The helmet is a deep metallic emerald green shell with a black facemask; the decal on each side is a secondary logo, consisting of the primary logo's "JETS" wordmark and football graphic in white.

The team also has a black alternate uniform with white numerals outlined in green, green stripes, and black socks. For 2022 the team introduced a matte-black alternate helmet with a metallic-green facemask, and the secondary logo in green outlined in white.

History of the Jets' logos and uniforms

1960–1962: Titans of New York

The original Titans of New York wore navy blue jerseys with old gold numerals, gold pants with two parallel blue stripes on each side, and navy blue helmets with a single gold stripe down the center and no logo decals. The white jerseys had navy blue numerals. The designs resembled those of Notre Dame due to an affinity the franchise's original principal owner, Harry Wismer, had for the Fighting Irish. Wismer, who was considered a sportscasting pioneer, broadcast replays of Notre Dame football games prior to owning the Titans. In 1961 the Titans added UCLA-style shoulder stripes (white and gold on the blue jerseys, navy blue and gold on the white jerseys), changed the pants striping to a blue stripe flanked by white stripes, and employed a somewhat brighter shade of gold.

1963–1977: Kelly green and white

When a Sonny Werblin-led syndicate purchased the team prior to the 1963 season and renamed it the Jets, the entire uniform was redesigned and replaced. Navy and gold were abandoned in favor of kelly green and white; white pants and green or white jerseys. Werblin had embraced those colors because he was born on Saint Patrick's Day. The jersey sleeves were opposite-colored (white on green and vice versa) from shoulder to elbow, with thick stripes above and below the TV numerals. The pants were white with two parallel green stripes on each side, and the socks were green above the ankle with two parallel white stripes around the calf. The new helmets were white with a single green stripe down the center; the logo decal on each side was a silhouette of a jet airplane in green, with the nose pointed toward the front of the helmet and the word "JETS" in thick white sans-serif italics along the fuselage. In 1964, the single green stripe became two parallel stripes, and the jet-plane decals were replaced with a white football shape outlined in green, with the word "JETS" in green sans-serif italics in front of "NY" in green outline serif lettering, and a miniature football at bottom center. The decals were difficult to see from a distance (or on television), so the colors were reversed and the decals enlarged in 1965.

This design remained largely unchanged through 1977, apart from some variations to the numeral and lettering typefaces, the angle of the helmet decals, and adjustments to the shoulder and sleeve striping due to changes in NFL jersey tailoring and materials. The white stripes on the socks were eliminated in 1975.

Also, for the first four games of 1971, the Jets used a variation of their white jerseys that had no green stripes on the shoulders above the green sleeves. The white jerseys with the green stripe over the shoulder finally appeared when the Jets wore them at home in week eight vs. the Kansas City Chiefs.

1978–1997: Green helmets and modern logo

The Jets' first major design change was made for the 1978 season. The kelly green and white color scheme was retained; the new helmets were solid green with white facemasks, and a stylized "JETS" wordmark in white on each side. The mark featured angular italic lettering and a silhouette of a generic modern jet airplane extending horizontally to the right from the top of the "J" above the "ETS". The jerseys featured large TV numerals on the shoulders and two thick parallel stripes on the sleeves, while the pants had a single green stripe from hip to knee on each side. The team used both serif and sans-serif lettering for player names on the back of the jerseys in 1978 and 1979, then sans-serif only beginning in 1980. From 1985-89, the Jets wore their white jerseys at home as well as on the road; the green jerseys appeared only on rare occasions in road games when the host team wore white.
  
In 1990, the Jets modified this design by adding thin black outlines to the numerals, lettering, stripes and helmet decals, and changing the facemasks from white to black. The team reverted to using the green jersey as its primary home uniform, reintroduced the white stripes on the socks, and added a set of green pants to be worn with the white jerseys along with white socks that had two parallel green stripes around the calf. In 1995, player names on the backs of the jerseys were changed from black-outlined sans-serif lettering to one-color serif lettering. The team occasionally wore white pants and standard socks with the white jerseys in 1995 and 1996, then did so for all games in 1997.

1998–2018: Retro update

Upon taking over as administrator and head coach in 1997, Bill Parcells took the initiative and began the process of re-forming the team's identity, which included redesigning the team's uniforms, logos and wordmarks for the 1998 season. The team changed its primary uniform color from the bright kelly green to the darker hunter green, abandoned black as a trim color, and replaced the stylized "JETS" wordmark with a modified version of the 1965-77 logo, this one oval rather than football-shaped and with a somewhat "cleaner" appearance, with starker lines defining the lettering and football graphic. The helmets reverted to white with two parallel green stripes down the center, the new primary logo decal on each side, and new green facemasks. The jerseys and pants also resembled the 1963-77 uniforms, with alternating shoulder stripes, opposite-colored sleeves and TV numerals, and two green parallel stripes from hip to knee on each side. The new primary logo was also added to the jersey front, by the player's left shoulder. The socks became solid green above the ankle, with no stripes.

This uniform remained largely unchanged through 2018, save for some variations in coloration and shoulder/sleeve tailoring, and the occasional commemorative patch. In 2002, the team introduced a set of green pants with two parallel white stripes on each side, along with white socks with green stripes resembling those used with the green pants from 1990-97. The green pants were worn occasionally with both the green and white jerseys through 2018.  Although the white socks were meant to be worn with the green pants, the team tended to use them whenever the white jerseys were worn, with either green or white pants.

2019–present: "Take Flight"

The Jets changed their uniforms again in 2019, abandoning the team's classic look for the second time. The new design replaced the dark hunter green with a medium green that the team calls "Gotham Green," and again added black to the traditional green-and-white color scheme. The primary logo was modified to be more football-shaped, with the "JETS" wordmark adjusted to make the "J" the same height as the other letters and moved slightly downward, the redesigned football graphic partially covering the lower portion of the letters "E" and "T". The serif outline "NY" behind the "JETS" wordmark was eliminated, and replaced with "NEW YORK" centered above it in smaller sans-serif italics.

The helmet was changed to a deep metallic emerald green shell with a black facemask, no striping, and a secondary logo on each side consisting of the "JETS" wordmark and football graphic from the primary logo. The green and white primary jerseys have numerals with thin black outlines in a new sans-serif block-style font, with single horizontal stripes around the shoulders tapering toward the collar, a "NEW YORK" wordmark above the numerals on the front, and the player's name in sans-serif block letters on the back. The TV numerals were shifted from the sleeves to the upper shoulders. The jerseys are paired with either green or white pants, with a tapered stripe on each side from hip to mid-thigh, and green or white socks. 

The Jets also introduced a black alternate uniform, with white numerals outlined in green, green striping, and black socks. For the 2022 season, after the NFL lifted its "one-shell" rule, the team added a matte-black alternate helmet with a metallic-green facemask; the lettering and football on the secondary-logo decal are green outlined in white. The Jets have also worn the black pants and socks with their white jerseys and green helmets for several games in 2022.

Throwbacks and special uniforms
In 1993 the Jets became the first NFL team to wear a "throwback" uniform, for a home game against the Cincinnati Bengals celebrating the 25th anniversary of the 1968 championship team. The jersey and pants mimicked the 1963-77 design, although the team wore its regular green helmets with a white-outlined version of the 1965-77 logo decal. Although it was a home game, the team wore white jerseys as it had done in Super Bowl III. In 1994, as part of the NFL's 75th Anniversary celebration, the Jets wore both home and road versions of this uniform in select games, again using their regular green helmets with the 1965-77 logo but with two parallel white stripes down the center, and a jersey patch by the player's left shoulder commemorating the NFL's 75th anniversary.

On October 14, 2007, the Jets celebrated their origin with a special Titans Throwback Day, a home game against the Philadelphia Eagles. The uniforms combined elements of the 1960 and 1961-62 uniforms, with navy blue helmets and jerseys, old gold serif numerals and helmet stripes, gold and white shoulder stripes, and gold pants with blue and white stripes on each side. The Jets wore these uniforms once more in December against the Miami Dolphins at Dolphin Stadium.

The Titans uniforms made another appearance in 2008; originally scheduled for the home opener against the Patriots, the throwback dates were changed to the second and third home games, against the Arizona Cardinals and Cincinnati Bengals, respectively. Later that season, on October 26 the Jets honored the 1968 championship team by displaying a commemorative 40th anniversary Super Bowl III patch on their left chest.

In 2009, as part of the NFL's celebration of the 50th season for the original eight teams of the American Football League, the Jets wore their blue Titans uniforms in a home game against the Tennessee Titans, who dressed as the 1960 Houston Oilers, on September 27, 2009. The Jets also introduced a white-jersey version of the Titans throwbacks, with navy blue numerals and navy and gold shoulder stripes. The Jets wore these against the Raiders in Oakland on October 25, 2009, and again against the Miami Dolphins at home on November 1.  Throughout the 2009 season, the Jets' jerseys featured their 50th anniversary patch; the Titans throwbacks also bore a commemorative AFL patch. Those throwbacks did not make an appearance in 2010 but were re-introduced a year later for a home game against the Jacksonville Jaguars. After that the NFL adopted a "one-helmet" rule as part of its concussion protocol, which precluded teams from using "throwback" helmets requiring a different-colored helmet shell until the rule was lifted in 2022.

On November 12, 2015, the Jets participated in the NFL's first "Color Rush" promotion on Thursday Night Football, at home against the Buffalo Bills. The uniform used the same design template as the standard uniform but with kelly green in place of hunter green; green jerseys and pants with white numerals and stripes, and solid green socks. Although the jerseys had the regular shoulder inserts the sleeves were not inverted, i.e., they were green with white TV numerals. The helmet decals, stripes and facemasks were also kelly green, with a shiny chromed finish. Because the Bills wore solid red uniforms in the game, the matchup was problematic for fans with red-green color blindness. When the two teams met again the following season for Thursday Night Football-"Color Rush" on September 15, 2016, the Jets wore their standard white uniforms and helmet decals with white facemasks and solid white socks.

On October 1, 2017, for a Sunday afternoon home game against the Jacksonville Jaguars, the Jets again wore white facemasks with their standard white uniforms, this time with the striped white socks. The kelly-green uniforms with chromed accents returned for a Thursday night "Color Rush" game on November 2, 2017, at home against the Bills, who wore white.

In 2018, the Jets wore white facemasks for a Monday night game in Detroit on September 10, then wore gray facemasks at home against the Indianapolis Colts on October 14 to mark the 50th Anniversary of the 1968 championship team that defeated the Colts (then hailing from Baltimore) in Super Bowl III. On October 21, at home against the Minnesota Vikings, they wore the kelly-green "Color Rush" uniforms with the chromed-green helmet accents, thus becoming the first NFL team to use four different facemask colors (white, gray and chromed green in addition to their standard green) in a single season. Also, on December 2 at Tennessee the Jets wore the green-topped socks instead of the white striped socks with the green pants, a first.

On November 4, 2021, the Jets paired their white jerseys with black pants and socks for the first time, in a road game against the Indianapolis Colts.

References

Bibliography
 

New York Jets
New York Jets